Clarks Creek may refer to:

Clarks Creek (Kansas), a stream in Geary and Morris counties
Clarks Creek (Missouri), a stream
Clarks Creek (Lackawanna River), a stream in Wayne County, Pennsylvania
Clarks Creek (Ararat River tributary), a stream in Patrick County, Virginia
Clarks Creek (Harrison County, Texas), a stream in Harrison County, Texas

See also
Clark Creek (disambiguation)